The Suburbs is the third studio album by Canadian indie rock band Arcade Fire, released on August 2, 2010. Coinciding with its announcement, the band released a limited edition 12-inch single containing the title track and "Month of May". The album debuted at No. 1 on the Irish Albums Chart, the UK Albums Chart, the US Billboard 200 chart, and the Canadian Albums Chart. It won Album of the Year at the 2011 Grammy Awards, Best International Album at the 2011 BRIT Awards, Album of the Year at the 2011 Juno Awards, and the 2011 Polaris Music Prize for best Canadian album. Two weeks after winning Grammy's Album of the Year, the album jumped from No. 52 to No. 12 on the Billboard 200, the album's highest ranking since August 2010.

Arcade Fire released a deluxe edition CD/DVD of The Suburbs on June 27, 2011 (everywhere except the U.S. and Canada). The American and Canadian versions were released on August 2, 2011, to coincide with the original album's anniversary. The new version included two brand new tracks recorded during The Suburbs album sessions ("Culture War" and "Speaking in Tongues", the latter featuring David Byrne), an extended version of album track "Wasted Hours", Spike Jonze's short film, Scenes from the Suburbs, and an 80-page booklet as well as other exclusive content.

Background
The album's lyrical content is inspired by band members Win and William Butler's upbringing in The Woodlands, Texas, a suburb of Houston. According to Win Butler, the album "is neither a love letter to, nor an indictment of, the suburbs – it's a letter from the suburbs". The album was recorded in Win Butler and Régine Chassagne's residence in Montreal, with some parts being recorded at the band's studio in Quebec and in New York City. Win Butler describes the overall sound of The Suburbs as "a mix of Depeche Mode and Neil Young", stating that he wanted the album to sound like "the bands that I heard when I was very young, and wondered what those crazy noises were". It was released by Merge Records in North America and by Mercury Records in the United Kingdom.

The band pressed each completed song to a 12″ lacquer, then recorded it back for the digital master of the album. There are eight alternative covers for the CD version of the album.

Promotion
A video for "Ready to Start" was released on August 20, 2010, directed by Charlie Lightning and filmed at the band's July 7, 2010 concert at the Hackney Empire in London. On August 30, 2010, an interactive video was released for "We Used to Wait" at http://www.thewildernessdowntown.com, written and directed by Chris Milk, designed in conjunction with Google Chrome, which makes use of Google Maps and Google Street View, and has been featured in Times "Short List".

Another music video, for the title track "The Suburbs", was released on November 18, 2010, directed by Spike Jonze. The video, filmed in Austin, Texas, follows a group of teenagers living in the suburbs, and features cameos by Win Butler and Sarah Neufeld as police officers. The music video is composed of excerpts from Jonze's short film, Scenes from the Suburbs, which debuted at the Berlin International Film Festival 2011, and has a running time of 30 minutes. Scenes from the Suburbs screened at the SXSW Film Festival 2011 and saw its online premiere on MUBI on June 27, 2011. Writing for the Canadian Press, Nick Patch called the film "a sci-fi puzzler that seems to blend the paranoia of Terry Gilliam films with the nostalgia of classic Steven Spielberg flicks".

Critical reception

The Suburbs received acclaim from music critics. At Metacritic, which assigns a normalized rating out of 100 to reviews from mainstream critics, the album has an average score of 87 out of 100, which indicates "universal acclaim" based on 43 reviews. Writing for BBC Music, Mike Diver described the album as the band's "most thrillingly engrossing chapter yet; a complex, captivating work that, several cycles down the line, retains the magic and mystery of that first tentative encounter" and stated that "you could call it their OK Computer." Several reviewers compared The Suburbs favourably to Arcade Fire's earlier work. Ian Cohen of Pitchfork called it "a satisfying return to form—proof that Arcade Fire can still make grand statements without sounding like they're carrying the weight of the world". Noel Murray of The A.V. Club described the album as being "like one long sequel" to the band's earlier single "No Cars Go". Q wrote that the band "may well have delivered their masterpiece."

David Marchese, writing in Spin, wrote of the album: "Radiant with apocalyptic tension and grasping to sustain real bonds, [it] extends hungrily outward, recalling the dystopic miasma of William Gibson's sci-fi novels and Sonic Youth's guitar odysseys. Desperate to elude its own corrosive dread, it keeps moving, asking, looking, and making the promise that hope isn't just another spiritual cul-de-sac." NMEs reviewer Emily Mackay compared The Suburbs to R.E.M.'s Automatic for the People in the sense of it being "an album that combines mass accessibility with much greater ambition. Pretty much perfect, in other words – and despite their best efforts, listening to it feels just like coming home." Uncut designated the album as their "Album of the Month"; in a 4-star review for the magazine, Alastair McKay called it "a surprising record, swapping the spit and fire of Funeral for a sense of mature playfulness", and concluding that "[it] explores the badlands between safety and boredom. It's nostalgic, with a sense of future dread. There is pain and pleasure, loss and hope. It feels like the anesthetic is wearing off."

Exclaim! listed the album as their No. 1 Pop & Rock Album of 2010. Writer Andrea Warner summarized it as "a perfect actualization of the suburbs as metaphor for the classic North American dream: a smoothly perfect veneer covering up the lush complexity of motivation. It's not just metaphor, but goes a step further to exemplify the quintessential Arcade Fire sound ― a controlled frenzy, pushing and reaching for something more."

The album was also included in the 2011 edition of the book 1001 Albums You Must Hear Before You Die.

Accolades
On June 16, 2011, the album was named as a long-listed nominee for the 2011 Polaris Music Prize. On July 6, The Suburbs was awarded a spot on the shortlist, making it one of ten possible candidates to win $30,000 and the recognition as the best Canadian album of the year as voted by jury of Canadian journalists and broadcasters. On September 19, 2011, it won the Polaris Music Prize.

The album won both Album of the Year at the Juno Awards of 2011, as well as the Album of the Year at the 53rd Grammy Awards, and earned a nomination for Best Alternative Music Album, won International Album at the 2011 BRIT Awards and was also on numerous best-albums-of-the-year lists:

#1 – BBC 6 Music's Top 50 albums of the year
#1 – Clash Magazine's Top 40 Albums of 2010
#1 – Exclaim!s Top 20 Albums of 2010
#1 – Q Magazine's Top 50 Albums of 2010
#1 – Triple J Listeners' Top 10 Albums
#2 – Billboards Top 10 Albums of 2010
#2 – Magnets Top 20 Albums of 2010
#2 – NMEs Top 75 Albums of 2010
#2 – Relevant Magazines Top 10 Albums of 2010
#2 – Stereogum's Top 50 Albums of 2010
#2 – Times Top 10 Albums of 2010
#2 – Under the Radars Top 50 Albums of 2010
#3 – Spins 40 Best Albums of 2010
#4 – MTV's 20 Best Albums of 2010
#4 – Rolling Stones 30 Best Albums of 2010
#7 – Paste Magazine's 50 Best Albums of 2010
#9 – American Songwriters Top 50 Albums of 2010
#11 – Drowned in Sound's Albums of the Year
#11 – Pitchfork's Top 50 Albums of 2010
#21 – Rough Trade Shops's Albums of the Year (UK)
#23 – Robert Christgau's 2010 Dean's List
Glide Magazines Top 20 Albums of 2010
NPR's 50 Favorite Albums of 2010

The single “Ready to Start” was nominated for the Grammy Award for Best Rock Performance by a Duo or Group with Vocal.

Track listingNotes"Suburban War" is the second to last track on the vinyl version of the album.
"We Used to Wait" finishes on an infinite loop at the end of Side 3 of the vinyl version.
In the Deluxe Edition, "Wasted Hours" is retitled as "Wasted Hours (A Life That We Can Live)" and features an extended ending. The track length goes to 4:26.
Initial copies of the album sold by selected independent music stores came with an exclusive 7" single of "Ready to Start" with a postcard.

PersonnelArcade FireWill Butler
Win Butler
Régine Chassagne
Jeremy Gara
Tim Kingsbury
Sarah Neufeld
Richard Reed ParryAdditional musiciansStrings: Sarah Neufeld, Owen Pallett, Richard Reed Parry and Marika Anthony Shaw
Additional strings: Clarice Jensen, Nadia Sirota, Yuki Numata, Caleb Burhans, Ben Russell and Rob Moose
Colin Stetson – saxophones (tracks 9, 13 & 15)
Pietro Amato – French horn (tracks 13 & 15)Technical'
Arcade Fire – (mixing, production, arrangement)
Owen Pallett – string arrangements
Markus Dravs – co-production
Mark Lawson – recording
Craig Silvey – mixing
Nick Launay – additional mixing (tracks 2, 4 & 15)
Marcus Paquin, Don Murnaghan and Noah Goldstein – additional recording
Brian Thorn – assistant (Magic Shop)
Brad Bell – assistant (Public Hi-Fi)
Adam Greenspan – assistant
Caroline Robert – artwork design
Vincent Morisset – art direction
Gabriel Jones – photography (assisted by Joey Matthews & Stephane Fiore)

Charts

Weekly charts

Year-end charts

Certifications and sales

!scope="row"|Worldwide
|
|1,000,000+
|-

See also

List of number-one independent albums (U.S)

References

External links
The Wilderness Downtown – Arcade Fire's interactive video for "We Used to Wait"
www.sprawl2.com – Arcade Fire's interactive video for "Sprawl II (Mountains Beyond Mountains)"

2010 albums
Arcade Fire albums
Albums produced by Markus Dravs
Brit Award for International Album
Concept albums
Grammy Award for Album of the Year
Juno Award for Album of the Year albums
Juno Award for Alternative Album of the Year albums
Mercury Records albums
Merge Records albums
Polaris Music Prize-winning albums
Works about suburbs